Smokin' Joe's is an Indian chain of pizzerias headquartered in Mumbai, India. It was founded in 1993 by Parsi entrepreneurs. Smokin' Joe's currently operates in number of cities in India. It has 58 stores throughout India.

Smokin' Joe's primarily concentrates on pizza and pizza related products such as pizza sandwiches. The menu features both vegetarian and meat products. Besides pizza, it also serves garlic bread, open subs, desserts, salads, and beverages.

History
The restaurant chain opened its first store in Carmichael Road, Mumbai, on 21 July 1993. Smokin' Joe's national headquarters are located in the Nepeansea Road, Mumbai.

Stores 
Smokin' Joe's stores can be found in Mumbai as well as other regions, like Pune, Surat, Nasik, Aurangabad, Lonavla, Chandigarh, Jammu, Srinagar, Yamuna Nagar, Bhubaneswar, Goa and Indore. Smokin' Joe's also plans to expand in Southern India.

See also
 Fast food
 List of fast food restaurant chains

References

A Passage to India
Pie in the sky

External links
 

Pizza franchises
Pizza chains of India
Restaurants established in 1993
Restaurants in Mumbai
Indian companies established in 1993
1993 establishments in Maharashtra